The list of the Swiss tariff networks contains tariff networks with SBB participation.

Switzerland has had a national integrated ticketing system for over a hundred years. This, however, was limited to the regional and mainline services, as well as some tourist traffic. It is known that not uniform pricing schedule and the participation of the individual companies could be limited to certain parts of the entire network (single tickets, multi-journey tickets, season tickets, half-price tickets collective, etc.). In an effort to include local traffic and therefore resulted in a regional tariff networks, which initially covered only the subscriptions in the narrow context of larger cities. Thus it was unnecessary for commuters, two or three passes to purchase for their commute. To provide this benefit also to the other passengers emerged from this integral tariff networks, those that cover the whole range of tickets. This grew into regional or national associations, which continue the existing direct transport are superimposed.

The first regional integrated ticketing in Switzerland was the Tariff Association of North Western Switzerland (Tarifverbund Nordwestschweiz, TNW), which was introduced in 1987. The first and only transport association is the Zurich Transport Network (Zürcher Verkehrsverbund, ZVV), in operation since 1990. The stated aim is to establish a pan-Swiss ticketing.

Key to tables
Abbreviation: The abbreviation often begins with "T" or "TV" for Tarifverbund.
Full name and marketing name: Shows the official name first, followed by the marketing name, if any, in guillemets.
Regions: Areas included in the respective tariff network.
Population: The number of residents connected to the network (2007).
Network length: The length of the entire route network in kilometers.
Number of stops: The number of stops of a composite (2007).

Networks with comprehensive ticket offerings

Networks offering transit passes only

Notes and references 

Passenger rail transport in Switzerland